National Route 388 is a national highway of Japan connecting Saiki, Ōita and Yunomae, Kumamoto in Japan, with a total length of 229.4 km (142.54 mi).

References

National highways in Japan
Roads in Kumamoto Prefecture
Roads in Miyazaki Prefecture
Roads in Ōita Prefecture